Magnus Karlsson (born April 7, 1984) is a Swedish bandy player who currently plays for GAIS Bandyklubb as a defender, midfielder or half back.

Magnus has played for three clubs.  They are:
 Nässjö IF (2001-2005)
 Vetlanda BK (2005-2009)
 GAIS Bandyklubb (2009-)

External links
  Magnus Karlsson at Bandysidan
  Gais Bandy

Swedish bandy players
Living people
1984 births
Nässjö IF players
Vetlanda BK players
GAIS Bandy players
Dynamo Kazan players
Surte BK players
Expatriate bandy players in Russia